Children of Nagano is a 2023 Czech sport comedy directed by Dan Pánek. The creators presented the film to journalists on 16 February  2023. It premiered in theatres on 22 February of the same year.

Plot
Schoolboy Dominik (11) decides to play ice hockey due to euphory after watching the national team's victory in the tournament of the century in Nagano. He gets a hockey stick and puts together a group of boys; they train together on the concrete area behind the house, and it doesn't matter at all that they play with a tennis ball. They plan to challenge the older boys from the neighboring village to a match; in addition, Dominik strives for the favor of his classmate Katka.

Cast
Hynek Čermák as Karel
Klára Issová as Eva
Taťjana Medvecká as grandma Natálie
Otakar Brousek as grandpa Josef
Tomáš Richard Brenton as Dominik
Pavel Batěk as Milan
Johana Racková as Katka
Simona Babčáková as teacher Hrabáková
Dominik Hašek as himself

References

External links
 
 Children of Nagano at CSFD.cz 

2023 films
Czech comedy films
Czech sports films
2020s Czech-language films